Bloomberg TV Indonesia was a defunct 24-hour business news channel in Indonesia, owned by Idea Karya Indonesia. It was launched on July 11, 2013 on First Media. Most of its live programs are broadcast from a high definition studio in the heart of Jakarta.

As the first international business channel aired in the Indonesian language, Bloomberg TV Indonesia not only delivered news in numbers and data, but also provided insights and analysis on market movements, as well as the decision-makers' thoughts in Indonesia. Its coverage was supported by Bloomberg Television news network.

Bloomberg TV Indonesia's programs focussed on information and education in economics, financing, and also business sector to fulfill Indonesian people's demand. Especially for the middle class.

Platform
Bloomberg TV Indonesia was available on many platforms like terrestrial (free to air) via various local TV networks in Indonesia, Pay TV (First Media channel 13, BIGTV channel 681, Transvision channel 317, Nexmedia channel 708, Viva+ channel 13, Topas TV, Max3, Neo, dan Innovate), and Over-the-Top content (OTT) (Mivo TV and Domikado application, Vivall). Live TV streaming is also provided on the www.bloombergindonesia.tv, with video on demand from Bloomberg TV Indonesia's programs.

Bloomberg TV Indonesia is broadcast on these local TV networks

Broadcast Networks 
 Jakarta - 29 UHF
 Yogyakarta - 34 UHF
 Bandung - 40 UHF
 Semarang - 39 UHF
 Medan - 26 UHF

Programming
Bloomberg TV Indonesia's programming was focused on information and education in the economic, financial and business sector to address the needs of Indonesians, especially the rising number of middle class in the country. Most of its broadcasts were based on local business and economic program (80%) and enriched with international programs (20%).

8 hours of its 24-hour broadcast were filled with live news programs and the rest were filled with programs that had a relation with business, economics and entrepreneurship world. Bloomberg Indonesian TV also broadcast some of the programs from the international Bloomberg TV channel.

Availability
Bloomberg TV Indonesia was available in many platforms, such as terrestrial (through several local television channels by networking system), satellite, and Over-the-Top content (OTT) (such as Mivo TV, Domikado, Vivall app). Beside that, its official website also provided live streaming complete with video on demand from the channel's programs.

References

24-hour television news channels in Indonesia
Television channels and stations established in 2013
Business-related television channels
Television channels and stations disestablished in 2015